A VIP airline is an airline which operates planes equipped in a luxurious manner (wood trim and paneling, for example), typically with drastically reduced seating numbers, partitioned sections (separated from each other) for privacy, seats facing each other with a table between. Seating tends to be larger so one seat per side where often there would be three (on a standard aircraft). Seating tends not to be in rows but in a more spacious lounge arrangement with no particular order. Such planes can often have televisions and telephones. VIP flights are all chartered and are typically used by VIP clients or businesses.

See also
 List of airlines
 List of airports in Russia
 List of small airlines and helicopter airlines of Russia
 List of airlines of Russia

References

Russia
Airlines
Airlines, VIP